Tsiu Hang is the name of several places in Hong Kong:

 Tsiu Hang, North District, a village in Sha Tau Kok, North District
 Tsiu Hang, Sai Kung District, a village and an area in Sai Kung District
 Tsiu Hang, Tai Po District, an area in Tai Po District